William de Asevedo Furtado (born 3 April 1995), known as William, is a Brazilian footballer who plays as a right back for Cruzeiro.

Career statistics

Honours

Club
Internacional
 Campeonato Brasileiro Sub-20:2013
 Copa do Brasil Sub-20: 2014
 Campeonato Gaúcho: 2015, 2016
 Recopa Gaúcha: 2016

International
Brazil
Olympic Gold Medal: 2016

References

1995 births
Living people
Brazilian footballers
Sport Club Internacional players
VfL Wolfsburg players
FC Schalke 04 players
Cruzeiro Esporte Clube players
Campeonato Brasileiro Série A players
Campeonato Brasileiro Série B players
Bundesliga players
Association football defenders
Brazilian expatriate footballers
Expatriate footballers in Germany
Brazilian expatriate sportspeople in Germany
Sportspeople from Rio Grande do Sul
Olympic footballers of Brazil
Footballers at the 2016 Summer Olympics
Olympic gold medalists for Brazil
Olympic medalists in football
Medalists at the 2016 Summer Olympics